The murder of 29-year-old Jason Hudson and his mother Darnell Donerson, occurred on October 24, 2008. They were discovered shot to death inside Donerson's home in Chicago, Illinois. The victims were the brother and mother of singer Jennifer Hudson. Jennifer's seven-year-old nephew Julian King, the son of her elder sister Julia Hudson, was initially reported missing and an AMBER Alert was issued; Julian King's body was found on October 27 in Chicago's West Side area, in a parked car matching the AMBER Alert description. Autopsy results indicated that Julian King's death was due to "multiple gunshot wounds." A pistol found in a West Side vacant lot was confirmed as the murder weapon by Chicago police.

Investigation
On the day that the bodies of Hudson's mother and brother were discovered, Chicago police took Julia Hudson's estranged husband William Balfour, 27, into custody but did not file charges against him. Balfour was on parole and spent nearly seven years in prison for attempted murder, vehicular hijacking and possession of a stolen vehicle. The Illinois Department of Corrections' records reveal one of Balfour's addresses to be the home where Donerson and Jason Hudson were murdered.

After the Chicago police had held Balfour for the maximum 48 hours allowable without charging him with a crime, he was held by the Illinois Department of Corrections on a parole violation. At the November 10, 2008 parole hearing, the prisoner review board was told by the Cook County State's Attorney's office that Balfour's current or former girlfriend told investigators she saw Balfour with a gun identical to the murder weapon several days before the murder occurred. Board chairman Jorge Montes said that although Balfour may have violated other conditions of his parole, including failing to get anger management and substance abuse counseling, the gun allegation alone was sufficient to hold Balfour until a December 3 hearing before the full Illinois Prisoner Review Board.

Montes said that the allegations from the woman included that Balfour had admitted to her that he was involved in the murders, but those allegations were not part of the parole review hearing. Balfour appeared at the hearing without an assigned attorney because he had not been charged with a crime.

Arrest and Conviction
On December 1, 2008, Balfour was arrested and charged with three counts of first-degree murder for the deaths of Donerson, Jason Hudson and King, as well as one count of felony home invasion. At a December 3 court hearing in which Balfour was denied bail, a prosecutor alleged that Balfour had committed the murders out of anger that his estranged wife was dating another man. Balfour's attorney Joshua Kutnick said that his client maintained his innocence in the crimes. Balfour was indicted on December 30. On January 20, 2009, he pleaded not guilty to all charges.  He was convicted in May, 2012 and sentenced to 3 life sentences plus 120 years.

Legacy
In the aftermath of the deaths, Hudson's family announced the creation of the Hudson-King Foundation for Families of Slain Victims, a foundation "to care for the needs of families who have lost relatives to a violent crime," according to a statement released to the press.

References 

Hudson, Jason
Hudson, Jason
Hudson, Jason
2008 in Illinois